Putte is a Belgian municipality in the Province of Antwerp, near Mechelen

Putte may also refer to:

Places
Villages on the border between the Netherlands and Belgium:
Putte, Kapellen, part of the Belgian municipality of Kapellen (and Stabroek)
Putte, Netherlands, part of the municipality of Woensdrecht

People
nickname of Ingvar Carlsson (ice hockey) (born 1942), Swedish retired ice hockey player and head coach
nickname of Götrik Frykman (1891-1944), Swedish bandy and football player
nickname of Rudolf Putte Kock (1901–1979), Swedish football, ice hockey and bridge player
Hans Olof Putte Wickman (1924-2006), Swedish jazz clarinetist

See also
Putt (disambiguation)
Putten (disambiguation)
Van De Putte, a surname
Putti (disambiguation)

Lists of people by nickname